Ocean Robbins (born November 12, 1973) is an American entrepreneur, professor and author. He is best known for co-founding Food Revolution Network, Inc. a California-based company that advocates for a whole foods, plant-based diet.

Biography
Robbins was born to John Robbins, author of Diet for a New America. He is the grandson of Baskin-Robbins cofounder Irvine Robbins. Robbins spent much of his early life advocating for environmental change. At the age of 15, he co-founded the Creating our Future speaking tour aimed at empowering students for environmental change and also presented at the United Nations. In 1990, Robbins founded the non-profit Youth for Environmental Sanity (YES!) to continue his mission of advocating for sustainability and social justice. He directed the organization until 2010. In 2012, Robbins co-founded Food Revolution Network in conjunction with his father. Robbins has also served as adjunct professor in the Peace Studies department at Chapman University.

His book 31-Day Food Revolution debuted as a best seller on WSJ and USA Today.

Personal life 

Ocean and his wife Michele are raising twin special needs boys.

Bibliography

References

External links

Food Revolution Network

1973 births
Living people
American people of Jewish descent
Plant-based diet advocates